Become What You Are is the debut studio album by the American alternative rock band the Juliana Hatfield Three, released on August 3, 1993, by Mammoth Records. The album includes the hit singles "My Sister" and "Spin the Bottle".

Recording and release
The band's singer and guitarist, Juliana Hatfield, recorded Become What You Are with drummer Todd Philips, formerly of Moving Targets and Bullet LaVolta, and bassist Dean Fisher, who she met during high school in Duxbury, Massachusetts. Unlike her previous album Hey Babe, which deals with personal topics, Hatfield decided to write songs about other things and make them more universal. The title of the album was inspired by German philosopher Friedrich Nietzsche, whom Hatfield admired.

The album was recorded at Hollywood Sound, mixed at Oceanway Studios and mastered at Precision Mastering in Los Angeles. It was released on August 3, 1993, by Mammoth Records. The song "Spin the Bottle" is featured on the soundtrack of the 1994 film Reality Bites. As of February 2010, Become What You Are had sold 267,000 copies in the US according to Nielsen SoundScan.

Critical reception

Become What You Are received generally favorable reviews. Stephen Thomas Erlewine of AllMusic praised Hatfield's honest vocals on "Supermodel," "My Sister," and "Spin the Bottle", stating that "her talents are strong enough to carry the album over the weak spots." The album was ranked No. 9 in NMEs Albums of the Year list for 1993.

Track listing
All songs written by Juliana Hatfield, except where noted.

Personnel
Credits are adapted from the album's liner notes.

The Juliana Hatfield Three
 Juliana Hatfield – guitar, vocals
 Dean Fisher – bass
 Todd Philips – drums
Additional musicians
 Denny Fongheiser – percussion
 Peter Holsapple – keyboards

Technical personnel
 Scott Litt – producer, engineer
 Ed Brooks – engineer, assistant engineer
 Martin Schmelzle – assistant engineer
 Steve Holroyd – mixed assistant
 Stephen Marcussen – mastering
 Jean Cronin – design
 Melanie Nissen – photography

Charts

References

External links
 

1993 debut albums
Albums produced by Scott Litt
Juliana Hatfield albums
Mammoth Records albums